Eupithecia streptozona is a moth in the family Geometridae. It is found in Madagascar.

References

Moths described in 1932
streptozona
Moths of Madagascar